Cedar Ridge High School is an accredited comprehensive public high school located in Newark, Arkansas, United States. It is  administered by the Cedar Ridge School District. In 2003, Cedar Ridge School District was formed resulting in the consolidation of the former Cord-Charlotte High School and Newark High School.

Academics 
Cedar Ridge High School is a Title I school that is accredited by the ADE and has been accredited by AdvancED since 1988.

Curriculum 
The assumed course of study follows the Smart Core curriculum developed by the Arkansas Department of Education (ADE), which requires students complete at least 22 units prior to graduation. Students complete regular coursework and exams and may take Advanced Placement (AP) courses and exam with the opportunity to receive college credit.

Athletics 
The Cedar Ridge High School mascot is the Timberwolf. The current school colors borrow from the older districts — orange from Newark, and blue from Cord-Charlotte.

The Cedar Ridge Timberwolves compete in interscholastic activities within the 2A Classification administered by the Arkansas Activities Association.

 Basketball: The boys basketball team won its first Class 2A state basketball championship in 2013.

References

External links 
 

Public high schools in Arkansas
Public middle schools in Arkansas
Schools in Independence County, Arkansas